Live in Texas is the first live album and third DVD by American rock band Linkin Park, originally released on November 18, 2003. The band's main setlist includes songs from their studio albums Hybrid Theory and Meteora, as well as one song from their remix album Reanimation. The live album peaked at #23 on the Billboard 200, and it has sold 1.1 million copies in the United States. The audio version of the concert includes 12 out of the 17 tracks. At the end of "A Place for My Head", lead singer Chester Bennington breaks guitarist Brad Delson's guitar. At the end of the concert, DJ Joe Hahn threw a piece of his equipment on the stage floor.

Background
The DVD comes with a bonus CD that features twelve of the songs from the DVD. The other five live tracks can be found on the LP Underground 3.0 CD. The audio on the CD is mixed differently from the audio on the DVD. The DVD/CD comes in two versions: a CD case and, although harder to find, a DVD case. Live in Texas was awarded Gold certification in 2003 by the RIAA, only 29 days after the release of album, and Platinum certification in 2007.

The concert footage was shot on August 2 and August 3 during the Summer Sanitarium Tour 2003 at Reliant Stadium in Houston, Texas, and Texas Stadium in Irving, Texas. The video footage is made up of the audio from the Dallas show and video from both the Houston and Dallas shows; because of this the band had to wear the same clothes on two shows, although there are still noticeable differences. For example, it can be seen that Mike Shinoda wears two similar but different shirts, Brad Delson's guitar sometimes changes multiple times in the middle of songs from a red PRS to a black Ibanez, Dave Farrell's basses change a few times as well in the middle of songs, as well as lead singer Chester Bennington's shirt soaked with sweat, and it being completely dry the next time he is shown on screen.

Lars Ulrich also makes a quick, surprise appearance dressed up as a Hulk-fisted bunny man during "From the Inside".

In some Asian countries, the package was released with a VCD instead of a DVD. The VCD contains identical content.

The audio versions of "From the Inside" and "Runaway" were released as the b-sides of the "From the Inside" single. When "Lying from You" was released as a single, the footage from Live in Texas was used as the song's music video with the studio version dubbed over.

iTunes
The live performances of "Points of Authority" and "Lying from You" are available for purchase on iTunes.

Reception

Johnny Loftus of Allmusic gave the album a mixed review, saying "their cool professionalism makes Live in Texas sound somewhat sterile," as well as saying the band "seems lost inside its own sound." Nevertheless, he also says that the album "will likely serve as a [the fans'] memento of the tour."

Track listing

CD

Enhanced CD Extras
 Website toolkit
 Merchandise 
 Screensaver
 Web links

DVD
"Don't Stay"
"Somewhere I Belong"
"Lying from You"
"Papercut"
"Points of Authority"
"Runaway"
"Faint"
"From the Inside"
"Figure.09"
"With You"
"By Myself"
"P5hng Me A*wy"
"Numb"
"Crawling"
"In the End"
"A Place for My Head"
"One Step Closer" (contains verses from "1stp Klosr")

Personnel

Linkin Park
 Chester Bennington – vocals
 Rob Bourdon – drums
 Brad Delson – lead guitar
 Joe Hahn – turntables, sampling, programming
 Dave "Phoenix" Farrell – bass
 Mike Shinoda – vocals, rhythm guitar, keyboard
CD production
Produced and mixed by: Josh Abraham
Engineered by: Ryan Williams
ProTools engineer: Brandon Belsky
Mixed at Pulse Recordings, Los Angeles, California

DVD production
Director: Kimo Proudfoot
DVD producer: Matt Caltabiano
Director of photography: Jim Hawkinson
Edited by: Kevin McCullough

Production team
Worldwide representation: Rob McDermott for The Firm
Additional representation by: Ryan Saullo and Ryan DeMarti
Booking agent: Mike Arfin for Artist Group International
Legal: Danny Hayes for Davis, Shapiro, Lewit, Montone & Hayes
Business manager: Michael Oppenheim and Jonathan Schwartz for Gudvi, Sussman and Oppenheim
Worldwide licensing and merchandising: Bandmerch
Creative direction: Mike Shinoda and the Flem
Art direction and design: The Flem
Digipak design: The Flem
Booklet design: Lawrence Azerrad Design
Digipak photography: Gret Watermann
Recorded live August 2, 2003 at Reliant Stadium in Houston, TX and August 3, 2003, at Texas Stadium in Irving, TX on Metallica's Summer Sanitarium Tour
Mobile audio recording:
Live recording engineer: Joel Singer with Effanel Music
Assistant recording engineer: Hardi Kamsani with Effanel Music
Mobile recording equipment provided by: Effanel Music
DVD producer: David May
DVD mastered by: Gateway Mastering
DVD production director: Penny Marciano
DVD graphics coordinator: Raena Winscott
DVD graphics design: Sean Donnelly and Kimo Proudfoot
Authoring: Wamo

Charts

Weekly charts

Year-end charts

Certifications

References

External links
"Live in Texas" on YouTube

Linkin Park albums
Linkin Park video albums
2003 live albums
2003 video albums
Live video albums
Warner Records live albums
Warner Records video albums